

Oman
 Mombasa – Nasr ibn Abdallah al-Mazru‘i, Wali of Mombasa (1698–1728)

Ottoman Empire
 Principality of Abkhazia – Jigetshi (1700–1730)

Great Britain
 Massachusetts – Joseph Dudley, Governor of Massachusetts Bay Colony (1702–1715)

Portugal
 Angola – Military junta (1702–1705)
 Macau – Jose da Gama Machado, Governor of Macau (1703–1706)

Spain
New Spain – Francisco Fernández de la Cueva, Viceroy of New Spain (1702–1710)
Sicily – Francesco Del Giudice, Viceroy of Sicily (1702–1705)

Colonial governors
Colonial governors
1704